A partial listing of recording artists who recorded for the Columbia label of the Columbia Graphophone Company, later also EMI. Please make a note if recordings were only leased from another label, this page should only list recording artists, with a few exceptions.

A

Adamo
David Alexander
Christian Anders
The Animals
Paul Anka (recordings leased from ABC-Paramount)
Richard Anthony
The Avons

B
Baltimora
Chris Barber
The Barron Knights
John Barry
Shirley Bassey
Gilbert Bécaud
Jeff Beck
Chuck Berry (late 1950s, briefly leased from Chess Records)
Acker Bilk
Graham Bonney
Brainbox
Los Bravos
Clara Butt

C
Eddie Calvert
Howard Carpendale
Chicago Symphony Orchestra
C.C.S.
The Dave Clark Five
Chubby Checker (first albums, leased from Parkway Records)
Rosemary Clooney (leased recordings)
Alma Cogan
The Congregation
Russ Conway
Steve Conway
Roger Cook
Charlélie Couture "3 Folies" Live (1989)
Julie Covington
Jimmy Crawford

D
Joey Dee and the Starliters (leased recordings from Roulette Records)
David and Jonathan
Billie Davis
Kiki Dee
Carol Deene
Ken Dodd
The Dubliners
Clive Dunn
The Dovells (leased recordings from Parkway Records)
Dr. Feelgood and the Interns (leased recordings from Okeh Records)
Slim Dusty

E
The Essex (leased from Roulette Records, USA)
Erste Allgemeine Verunsicherung (Austria)

F
Bent Fabric
Georgie Fame
José Feliciano
 Kathleen Ferrier
Jackson C. Frank
Freddie and the Dreamers
Conny Froboess
Dean Ford and The Gaylords

G
Gerry and the Pacemakers
The Gods
The Golden Gate Quartet
Ron Goodwin

H
Gitte Hænning
Rolf Harris
Heino
Heinz
Herman's Hermits
Benny Hill
Vince Hill
Michael Holliday
The Hollies
Frankie Howerd
Chris Howland

I
Frank Ifield

J
John's Children
Paul Jones

K
Kathy Kirby
The Koobas
Peter Kraus

L
Cleo Laine
Frank Foo Foo Lammar
Major Lance  (recordings leased from Okeh Records)
London String Quartet
The Lords
Lulu
Frankie Lymon and the Teenagers (recordings leased from Gee Records)

M
Jeanne Mas (1980s)
The George Martin Orchestra
Hank Marvin
Mascarenhas
Ray Miller (German singer)
Guy Mitchell (leased recordings)
Zoot Money's Big Roll Band
Russell Morris (Columbia/EMI Australia)
The Mudlarks
Ruby Murray

N
Nina & Frederik
Peter Noone
Nomadi

O
Des O'Connor
Esther Ofarim

P
Norrie Paramour and his Orchestra
Don Partridge
Peter and Gordon
Edith Piaf
Pink Floyd (first three albums, they then switched to Harvest. Their 1975 album Wish You Were Here, recorded for Harvest, was leased to CBS Columbia, USA)
The Playmates (leased from Roulette Records)
The Pretty Things (S.F. Sorrow, 1968, then switched to Harvest)
P.J. Proby

R
Johnnie Ray (leased recordings)
The Regents (NY group, leased from Gee, USA) 
Terry Reid
Cliff Richard
Malcolm Roberts
Amália Rodrigues
Bobby Rydell (leased from Cameo, USA)

S

The Seekers
The Shadows
Helen Shapiro
Dee Dee Sharp (leased from Cameo, USA)
Dinah Shore (leased recordings)
Frank Sinatra (leased recordings)
Erik Silvester (German singer)
Sir Henry and his Butlers
Sly and the Family Stone (original UK release of "Dance to the Music", leased from Epic Records)
Hurricane Smith
Soulsister (late 1980s)
Sounds Incorporated (Studio 2 Stereo)
Tommy Steele
Frederick Stock
Sweet Smoke
The Syndicats

T
The Tornados
Charles Trenet

V
Ricky Valance
Frankie Vaughan
Gene Vincent (1963 single)
Bobby Vinton (leased from Epic Records)

W
Helen Watson
John Walker
Iris Williams
Paul Whiteman (leased recordings)
Roger Whittaker
The Wurzels

Y
The Yardbirds

See also
 Columbia Graphophone Company

References

External links
Discography from Rateyourmusic.com

Lists of recording artists by label